Young People is a 1940 American musical drama film directed by Allan Dwan and starring Shirley Temple and Jack Oakie.  This would be Shirley's final film as a child actress.

Plot
Believing that it is good for their adopted daughter Wendy (Shirley Temple), Joe Ballantine (Jack Oakie) and his wife Kit (Charlotte Greenwood) decide to retire their vaudeville act and move the family to a small New England town. However, despite Wendy's many attempts to charm the locals, the "show folk" are given the cold shoulder. That is, until a hurricane hits the town, and because of the generosity, strength and conviction in the face of disaster, it appears that the troupers just might win over the residents in their new hometown after all.

Cast
 Shirley Temple as Wendy Ballantine (young Wendy is portrayed by her look-alike and includes footages from Curly Top and Stand Up and Cheer)
 Jack Oakie as Joe Ballentine
 Charlotte Greenwood as Kit Ballentine
 Arleen Whelan as Judith
 George Montgomery as Mike Shea
 Kathleen Howard as Hester Appleby
 Minor Watson as Dakin
 Frank Swann as Fred Willard
 Frank Sully as Jeb
 Mae Marsh as Maria Liggett
 Sarah Edwards as Mrs Stinchfield
 Irving Bacon as Otis
 Charles Haltin as Moderator
 Arthur Aylesworth as Doorman
 Olin Howard as Station Manager
 Harry Tyler as Dave
 Darryl Hickman as Tommy
 Shirley Mills as Mary Ann
 Diane Fisher as Susie
 Bobby Anderson as Jerry Dakin

Reception
Bosley Crowther of The New York Times wrote, "For patrons who can take so much precocity, it should be one of the more charming of the miracle child's films. Mr. Oakie and Miss Greenwood make a couple of amusing hoofers, and there are several nice songs to catch the ear. If this is really the end, it is not a bad exit at all for little Shirley, the superannuated sunbeam. But we rather suspect she'll be back." Variety wrote that the film "makes up in tunefulness and spontaneity what it lacks on the story side ... Miss Temple, relieved of the responsibility of carrying the entire picture on her shoulders, drops neatly into the groove assigned her." Film Daily wrote, "Shirley Temple's latest and last offering for 20th-Century Fox is loaded with entertainment and finds the youngster as appealing and attractive as ever." Harrison's Reports wrote, "Good! Although the story is lightweight, it has plentiful human interest, a few good musical numbers, comedy, and engaging performances." "Miss Temple has obviously retired in the full tide of her powers," John Mosher wrote in The New Yorker. "In 'Young People,' her swan song, so to speak, she shows no weariness, no slacking up, no arthritic pangs."

As with Temple's previous film, The Blue Bird, Young People was a box office disappointment.

References

External links
 

1940 films
Films directed by Allan Dwan
1940s musical drama films
20th Century Fox films
American musical drama films
American black-and-white films
1940 drama films
1940s American films